Puerto Suárez is an inland river port and municipality in Santa Cruz Department, Bolivia. It is located 10 km west of the border with Brazil.

Location 
Puerto Suárez is located in the province of Germán Busch, Santa Cruz Department and situated by Laguna Cáceres which is connected to the important Río Paraguay and Río Paraná waterway by the Tamengo Canal. It is also home to Bolivian Navy flotilla.

Transport 

The municipality is connected to the city of Santa Cruz in the west and Brazil in the east by major roads and rail-links as well as by an airport.

In 2013, a railway connection to the Peruvian port of Ilo was proposed. 

Puerto Suarez International Airport has some commercial airline service.

Population 
The town was founded on November 10, 1875 by Miguel Suárez Arana. The population was 11,564 (2001 census) and has increased to 12,546 (2007 estimate), some sources even say 20–22,000.

Climate

See also 

 Railway stations in Bolivia

References

External links 
 Map of province
 Population data

Ports and harbours of Bolivia
Populated places in Santa Cruz Department (Bolivia)
Populated places established in 1875